Kurikkala is a Finnish surname.

Geographical distribution
As of 2014, 98.8% of all known bearers of the surname Kurikkala were residents of Finland (frequency 1:32,915).

In Finland, the frequency of the surname was higher than national average (1:32,915) in the following regions:
 1. Central Ostrobothnia (1:2,229)
 2. North Ostrobothnia (1:3,559)
 3. Southern Savonia (1:20,436)

People
 Jussi Kurikkala (1912–1951), Finnish cross-country skier

See also
 Kurikka (magazine), Finnish satirical magazine

References

Finnish-language surnames
Surnames of Finnish origin